Aliye Demirbağ (born 19 February 1998) is a Turkish badminton player who competed at the 2014 Summer Youth Olympics in Nanjing, China. In 2015, she won the bronze medal at the European Junior Championships in Lubin, Poland. She competed at the 2018 Mediterranean Games, and grab the women's singles bronze medal.

Achievements

Mediterranean Games 
Women's singles

European Junior Championships 
Girls' singles

BWF International Challenge/Series (4 titles, 3 runners-up) 
Women's singles

Mixed doubles

  BWF International Challenge tournament
  BWF International Series tournament
  BWF Future Series tournament

References

External links 

 

1998 births
Living people
People from Elazığ
Turkish female badminton players
Badminton players at the 2014 Summer Youth Olympics
Mediterranean Games bronze medalists for Turkey
Competitors at the 2018 Mediterranean Games
Mediterranean Games medalists in badminton